The Veterans' Advisory Committee on Education Improvement Act of 2013 is a bill that would extend through the end of 2015 the Veterans' Advisory Committee on Education.  It would also change the composition of people sitting on that board by including members from more recent wars.  Committee members include veterans from various wars and experts in fields such as education and management.  The bill was introduced into the United States House of Representatives during the 113th United States Congress.

Provisions of the bill
This summary is based largely on the summary provided by the Congressional Research Service, a public domain source.

The Veterans' Advisory Committee on Education Improvement Act of 2013 would extend through the end of 2015 the Veterans' Advisory Committee on Education.  It would also require the Committee to include veterans representative of the post-9/11 operations in Iraq and Afghanistan.

Congressional Budget Office report
This summary is based largely on the summary provided by the Congressional Budget Office, as ordered reported by the House Committee on Veterans’ Affairs on August 1, 2013. This is a public domain source.

H.R. 2011 would extend the Secretary of Veterans Affairs’ authority to operate the Veterans’ Advisory Committee on Education through December 31, 2015. Under current law, that authority expires December 31, 2013. The Committee meets annually to provide advice and recommendations to the Secretary on the administration of education and training programs for veterans and other eligible individuals. The bill also would modify the composition of the Committee to include veterans of recent operations in Iraq and Afghanistan and representatives of institutions that furnish vocational rehabilitation services to veterans.

Based on information from the Department of Veterans Affairs, the Congressional Budget Office (CBO) estimates that implementing H.R. 2011 would cost less than $500,000 over the 2014-2018 period, assuming the availability of appropriated funds. Enacting the bill would not affect direct spending or revenues; therefore, pay-as-you-go procedures do not apply.

Procedural history

House
The Veterans' Advisory Committee on Education Improvement Act of 2013 was introduced on May 16, 2013 by Rep. John K. Delaney (D, MD-6).  It was referred to the United States House Committee on Veterans' Affairs and the United States House Veterans' Affairs Subcommittee on Economic Opportunity.  It was reported alongside House Report 113-211.  On October 25, 2013, House Majority Leader Eric Cantor announced that H.R. 2011 would be on the House schedule for the week of October 28, 2013.  It was scheduled for a vote on October 28, 2013 under a suspension of the rules.  The House was expected to deal with six different bills related to Veterans all on the same day, including this bill.  On October 28, 2013, the House voted in Roll Call Vote 562 to pass the bill 404-2.

Debate and discussion
The non-profit Student Veterans of America issued a press release on August 7, 2013, announcing their support for H.R. 2011.

See also
List of bills in the 113th United States Congress
Post-9/11 Veterans Educational Assistance Act of 2008

Notes/references

External links

Library of Congress - Thomas H.R. 2011
beta.congress.gov H.R. 2011
GovTrack.us H.R. 2011
OpenCongress.org H.R. 2011
WashingtonWatch.com H.R. 2011
House Republican Conference's legislative digest on H.R. 2011
Congressional Budget Office's report on H.R. 2011
House Report 113-211

Proposed legislation of the 113th United States Congress